Alice (minor planet designation: 291 Alice) is a stony background asteroid from the inner region of the asteroid belt. It was discovered by Johann Palisa on 25 April 1890 at the Vienna Observatory.

Photometric observations of this asteroid at the Leura Observatory in Leura, Australia during 2006 gave a rotation period of 4.313 ± 0.002 hours and a brightness variation of 0.20 ± 0.02 in magnitude. This result is in agreement with previous studies. Lightcurve analysis indicates that Alice's pole points towards either ecliptic coordinates (β, λ) = (55°, 65°)  or (β, λ) = (55°, 245°) with a 10° uncertainty. This gives an axial tilt of about 35° in both cases.

References

See also 
2037 Tripaxeptalis

External links 
 
 

Background asteroids
Alice
Alice
18900425